The Chinese Academy of Agricultural Sciences (short CAAS) is the Chinese national, agricultural scientific research organization.

It was established in 1957 in Beijing and oversees 45 institutes. Thirty-six are direct affiliates, nine institutes are co-hosted together with local governments or universities. It has more than 5,000 professional employees.

The Academy building contains offices of several Chinese policy institutions such as the China Association for the Promotion of International Agricultural Cooperation (CAPIAC) established in 1998. One of CAPIAC's branches is the International Cooperation Committee for Animal Welfare (ICCAW), established in 2011. In 2017, ICCAW hosted a farm animal welfare conference together with UN Food and Agriculture Organization, RSPCA, Compassion in World Farming, the U.S. Meat Export Federation and the U.S. National Pork Board.

List of institutes 

 Beijing branch
 Crop Sciences Institute
 Plant Protection Institute
 Vegetable and Flower Research Institute
 Institute of Agricultural Environment and Sustainable Development
 Beijing Institute of Animal Husbandry and Veterinary Medicine
 Bee Research Institute
 Feed Research Institute
 Agricultural Products Processing Research Institute
 Institute of Biotechnology
 Institute of Agricultural Economics and Development
 Institute of Agricultural Resources and Agricultural Regional Planning
 Agricultural Information Research Institute
 Institute of Agricultural Quality Standards and Testing Technology
 Institute of Food and Nutrition Development, Ministry of Agriculture and Rural Affairs
 China Agricultural Science and Technology Press
 Outside of Beijing
 Farmland Irrigation Research Institute
 Rice Research Institute
 Cotton Research Institute
 Oil Crops Research Institute
 Hemp Research Institute
 Fruit Research Institute
 Zhengzhou Fruit Research Institute
 Tea Research Institute
 Harbin Veterinary Research Institute
 Lanzhou Veterinary Research Institute
 Lanzhou Institute of Husbandry and Pharmaceutical Sciences
 Shanghai Veterinary Research Institute
 Grassland Research Institute
 Specialty Research Institute
 Environmental Protection Research and Monitoring Institute
 Biogas Science Institute
 Nanjing Institute of Agricultural Mechanization
 Tobacco Research Institute
 Shenzhen Agricultural Genome Research Institute
 Urban Agriculture Research Institute
 Co-hosted institutes
 Citrus Research Institute
 Beet Research Institute
 Sericulture Research Institute
 China Agricultural Heritage Research Office
 Buffalo Institute
 Grassland Ecological Research Institute
 Poultry Research Institute
 Sweet Potato Research Institute

References

Chinese Academy of Agricultural Sciences
Animal welfare and rights in China